She Doesn't Know may refer to:

 "She Doesn't Know", a song by Inndigo Blue from the soundtrack album for the film My Rainy Days, 2009
 "She Doesn't Know", a song by Willam from the album The Wreckoning, 2012
 "She Doesn't Know", a song by Brian McKnight from the album More Than Words, 2013

See also
 She Don't Know (disambiguation)